Richard Edward Gernert (September 28, 1928 – November 30, 2017), was an American professional baseball first baseman, outfielder and coach, who played in Major League Baseball (MLB) for the Boston Red Sox (–), Chicago Cubs, Detroit Tigers (–), Cincinnati Reds and Houston Colt .45's. He threw and batted right-handed. His uncle, Dom Dallessandro, was also a Major Leaguer.

Although Gernert spent much of the 1950s with the Red Sox, he often found himself sharing the first-base job with players such as Vic Wertz, Norm Zauchin and Mickey Vernon. A powerful right-handed batter, he was signed to take advantage of the Green Monster at Fenway Park.

In 11 MLB seasons, Gernert played in 835 games and had 2,493 at bats, 357 runs, 632 hits, 104 doubles, eight triples, 103 home runs, 402 runs batted in (RBI), 10 stolen bases, and 363 walks. He posted a .254 batting average, .351 on-base percentage, .426 slugging percentage, 1,061 total bases, 10 sacrifice hits, 13 sacrifice flies, and 12 intentional walks.

Gernert was involved in the first interleague trade without  waivers in baseball history, on November 21, 1959, when Boston shipped him to the Cubs for first baseman Jim Marshall and pitcher Dave Hillman. Gernert helped the Reds win the 1961 National League pennant, as a pinch hitter; however, in that World Series, which the Reds lost to the New York Yankees in five games, he was 0–4 in pinch-hitting roles.

After his playing days ended, Gernert was a coach for the Texas Rangers (–), a minor league manager, and longtime scout for numerous teams, most notably the New York Mets. Gernert died on November 30, 2017, at 89 years of age.

References

External links

Dick Gernert at SABR (Baseball BioProject)

1928 births
2017 deaths
Baseball players from Pennsylvania
Boston Red Sox players
Buffalo Bisons (minor league) players
Chicago Cubs players
Cincinnati Reds players
Cincinnati Reds scouts
Detroit Tigers players
Houston Colt .45s players
Louisville Colonels (minor league) players
Major League Baseball first base coaches
Major League Baseball first basemen
Minor league baseball managers
New York Mets scouts
Reading Red Sox players
San Jose Red Sox players
Scranton Miners players
Scranton Red Sox players
Sportspeople from Reading, Pennsylvania
Tacoma Giants players
Temple Owls baseball players
Texas Rangers coaches
Texas Rangers scouts
Washington Senators (1961–1971) scouts